Duhat wine, also called lomboy wine, is a Filipino fruit wine made from the fruits of black plum (duhat). It has a bright purple-red color. It is mostly produced in Southern Luzon.

References

Fermented drinks
Philippine alcoholic drinks
Philippine cuisine
Fruit wines